Radical Gotham: Anarchism in New York City from Schwab's Saloon to Occupy Wall Street is a 2017 history book edited by Tom Goyens and published by the University of Illinois Press.

Further reading

External links 
 

2017 non-fiction books
History books about anarchism
Books about New York City
English-language books
University of Illinois Press books